

BBC Radio 1Xtra Hot Summer Awards

!Ref.
|-
| 2013
| "Right Here" (with Foxes)
| Hottest Oap
| 
|

Berlin Music Video Awards
The Berlin Music Video Awards is international festival that puts filmmakers, musicians and the art behind music videos in the spotlight. Supporting both unknown and famous artists, it is primary a networking event for the video and music industries in Europe. Creators have the possibility to submit their works to various categories, such as Best Narrative, Animation, Song, Low Budget, Cinematography, Art Director, VFX, Director, Editor, Concept, Experimental, Production Company, Most Trashy, and Bizarre. The winners of each category compete for the Best Music Video and the final winner receives 3.000€.
!Ref.
|-
|2014
| "Powerless" (with Becky Hill)
| Best Editor
| 
|

Brit Awards
The BRIT Awards are the British Phonographic Industry's annual pop music awards.

!Ref.
|-
| 2013
| "Feel the Love" (with John Newman)
| rowspan=2|British Single of the Year
| 
|
|-
| rowspan=3|2014
| "Waiting All Night" (with Ella Eyre)
| 
|rowspan=3|
|-
| Home
| British Album of the Year
| 
|-
| Themselves
| Best British Group
| 
|-
| rowspan=2|2019
| rowspan=2|"These Days"(featuring Jess Glynne, Macklemore and Dan Caplen)
| British Single of the Year
| 
|rowspan=2|
|-
| British Video of the Year
|

European Festival Awards

!Ref.
|-
| 2015
| "Never Let You Go" (with Foy Vance)
| Festival Anthem of the Year
| 
|

Global Awards
The Global Awards are given by the Global company to honour the stars of music, news & entertainment across genres in the UK and from around the world.

!Ref.
|-
| rowspan=2|2019
| Themselves
| Best British Artist or Group
| 
| rowspan=2|
|-
| "These Days"(featuring Jess Glynne, Macklemore and Dan Caplen)
| Most Played Song
|

Hungarian Music Awards
The Hungarian Music Awards (Golden Giraffe Awards, before 2004) is an annual award ceremony held by the Hungarian music industry association Mahasz since 1992. 

!Ref.
|-
| 2016
| We the Generation
| International Electronic Music Album of the Year
| 
|

International Dance Music Awards
The International Dance Music Awards were established in 1985. It is a part of the Winter Music Conference, a weeklong electronic music event held annually.

!Ref.
|-
| rowspan=3|2014
| "Waiting All Night" (with Ella Eyre)
| Best Dubstep/Drum & Bass Track
| 
| rowspan=3|
|-
| rowspan=3|Themselves
| Best Dubstep/Drum & Bass DJ 
| 
|-
| Best Breakthrough Artist (Group) 
| 
|-
| 2016
| Best Artist (Group) 
| 
|

Ivor Novello Awards
The Ivor Novello Awards are awarded for songwriting and composing. The awards, named after the Cardiff born entertainer Ivor Novello, are presented annually in London by the British Academy of Songwriters, Composers and Authors (BASCA).

!Ref.
|-
| 2019
| "These Days"
| Most Performed Work
| 
|

MTV Europe Music Awards
The MTV Europe Music Awards was established in 1994 by MTV Europe to award the music videos from European and international artists.

!Ref.
|-
| rowspan=3|2013
| rowspan=3|Themselves
| Best Push Act
| 
|rowspan=3|
|-
| Best New Act
|
|-
| Best UK & Ireland Act
|

MOBO Awards

!Ref.
|-
| 2012
| Themselves
| Best Newcomer
| 
|
|-
|rowspan=3|2013
| Home
| Best Album
| 
| rowspan=3|
|-
| Themselves
| Best Male Act
| 
|-
| "Waiting All Night" (with Ella Eyre)
| Best Song
| 
|-
|2014
| "Powerless" (with Becky Hill)
| Best Video
| 
|

Mercury Prize

!Ref.
|-
| 2013
| Home
| Album of the Year
| 
|

Silver Clef Awards

!Ref.
|-
| 2018
| Themselves
| Innovation Award
| 
|

UK Music Video Awards
The UK Music Video Awards is an annual award ceremony founded in 2008 to recognise creativity, technical excellence and innovation in music videos and moving images for music.

!Ref.
|-
| 2012
| "Feel the Love" (with John Newman)
| rowspan=3|Best Dance Video - UK
| 
|
|-
| rowspan=2|2013
| "Waiting All Night" (with Ella Eyre)
| 
| 
|-
| "Not Giving In" (with John Newman & Alex Clare)
| 
| 
|-
| rowspan=2|2014
| "Powerless" (with Becky Hill)
| Best Urban Video - UK
| 
|rowspan=2|
|-
| Live at Brixton Academy
| Best Live Coverage
| 
|-
| 2015
| "Never Let You Go" (with Foy Vance)
| Best Colour Grade in a Video
| 
|
|-
| 2016
| Live Acoustic Session
| Best Live Coverage
| 
| 
|-
| 2019
| "Something About You"
| Best Dance Video - UK
| 
|
|-
| 2021
| "So Sorry" (with Skream)
| Best Dance/Electronic Video - UK
| 
|

Urban Music Awards
The Urban Music Awards (UMA) is a hip-hop, R&B, dance and soul music awards ceremony launched by Jordan Kensington in 2003 and now held in several countries.

!Ref.
|-
| 2012
| "Feel the Love" 
| Best Music Video
| 
|
|-
| rowspan=4|2013
| Home
| Best Album 
| 
|rowspan=4|
|-
| rowspan=6|Themselves
| Artist of the Year
| 
|-
| Best Dance Act
| 
|-
| rowspan=4|Best Group
| 
|-
| 2015
| 
|
|-
| 2016
| 
|
|-
| 2017
| 
|

YouTube Music Awards
The YouTube Music Awards, abbreviated as the YTMA, is an inaugural music award show presented by YouTube.

!Ref.
|-
| 2013
| Themselves
| YouTube Breakthrough
| 
|

References

Rudimental